Murder is a 2020 Indian Telugu-language crime thriller film directed by Anand Chandra, and produced by Ram Gopal Varma Anuraag Kancharla.

Plot
This film story is based on many of the true stories including 2018 Miryalaguda honour killing.

Cast
 Srikanth Iyyengar as Madhava Rao
 Sahithi Avancha as Namratha
 Gayatri Bhargavi as Vanaja
 Keshav Deepak as Narasimha
Ganesh Naidu as Praveen
 Giridhar as Madhava Rao's brother
Sumit Keshri as Praveen's friend

Reception 
Rentala Jayadeva in his review for Sakshi, appreciated the technical aspects of the film such as cinematography and film score while criticizing the weak plotline and mediocre performances. Asianet News critic Surya Prakash rated the film 2.5/5, noted Srikanth Iyyengar and Sahithi's performance as father and daughter, but pointed out the predictable screenplay and slow narration.

References

External links 
 
Murder at Nauzal

2020s Telugu-language films
Films directed by Ram Gopal Varma
2020 films